Jane Bakaluba (born 1939 in Kampala, also known as Jane Jägers or Jaggers Bakaluba and Jane Kironde Bakaluba) is a Ugandan novelist now living in Canada. Her best known work is Honeymoon for Three published in 1975 by the East African Publishing House in their series African Secondary Readers, in which she contrasts traditional and westernised women. She is a member of the Baganda people, and speaks Luganda and English. She worked in publishing in Kampala, and later emigrated to Canada.

In Women's Literature in Kenya and Uganda: The Trouble with Modernity in 2011, Kruger wrote that: "By the early 1990s only four Ugandan women writers (Rose Mboya [perhaps a misspelling of Rose Mbowa], Elvania Zirimu, Jane Bakaluba and Barbara Kimenye) had gained national prominence ...". She was one of fourteen women included in Oladele Taiwo's 1985 Female Novelists of Modern Africa, in a group of six who were "known mainly for a single novel each".

Selected publications
Honeymoon for Three (1975, East African Publishing House)
Nampewo agenda mu ssomero (2013, Kampala: Fountain Publishers, in Luganda)

References

1939 births
Living people
Ugandan novelists
20th-century Ugandan women writers
People from Kampala
Ugandan expatriates in Canada